Georg Asagaroff (1892–1957) was a Russian-born actor and film director. He left Russia following the 1917 Revolution and settled in Germany where he directed several films.

Selected filmography
 After Death (1915)
 Love of Life (1924)
 Eva and the Grasshopper (1927)
 Milak, the Greenland Hunter (1928)
 Escape from Hell (1928)
 Revolt in the Reformatory (1929)
 The Age of Seventeen (1929)
 The Green Monacle (1930)
 Das Donkosakenlied (1930)
 Checkmate (1931)
 The Mad Bomberg (1932)

References

Bibliography

External links

1892 births
1957 deaths
Male actors from Moscow
Film directors from the Russian Empire
Male film actors from the Russian Empire
Male silent film actors from the Russian Empire
White Russian emigrants to Germany
People who emigrated to escape Bolshevism